The Sahid Matangini railway station in the Indian state of West Bengal, serves Tamluk-Panskura Road, Tamluk, India in Purba Medinipur district. It is on the Panskura–Haldia line.

History
Rajgoda railway station is situated in Tamluk-Panskura Road, Tamluk, West Bengal. Station code is SMTG. It is a small railway station between Howrah and Haldia. Neighbourhood stations are Rajgoda and Tamluk. Local EMU trains Haldia–Howrah Fast Local, Digha–Panskura local, Mecheda–Digha local, Haldia–Panskura local, Howrah–Haldia local train stop here. The Panskura–Durgachak line was opened in 1968, at a time when Haldia Port was being constructed. It was subsequently extended to Haldia.  The Panskura–Haldia line was electrified in 1974–76. All lines were electrified with 25 kV AC overhead system. EMU train services between Panskura and Haldia introduced in 1976 and direct EMU services between Howrah and Haldia in 1979.

Gallery

References

External links
Trains at Saheed Matangini

Railway stations in Purba Medinipur district
Kolkata Suburban Railway stations